Highpoint Prison refers to two prisons located in Stradishall, Suffolk, England:

 Highpoint North (HM Prison), a Category C men's prison (previously known as Edmunds Hill Prison)
 Highpoint South (HM Prison), another Category C men's prison